A Sense of Direction is an album led by vibraphonist and composer Walt Dickerson recorded in 1961 and released on the New Jazz label.

Reception

AllMusic reviewer Steve Huey stated: "If it's a shade less challenging and inventive than This Is Walt Dickerson!, A Sense of Direction compensates by making Dickerson's innovations more accessible and inviting". DownBeat reviewer Pete Welding wrote: "if it is only slightly less adventurous than his initial recording, it is still an ardent collection -- primarily of ballads -- treated with unflagging invention and restrain ...Were it not for the slight conventionality of some of the numbers, the rating would have been five stars."

Track listing 
All compositions by Walt Dickerson except as indicated
 "Sense of Direction" - 6:00
 "Ode to Boy" - 5:30
 "Togetherness" - 3:00
 "What's New?" (Johnny Burke, Bob Haggart) - 4:44
 "Good Earth" - 3:33
 "Why" - 4:48
 "You Go to My Head" (J. Fred Coots, Haven Gillespie) - 8:19
 "If I Should Lose You" (Ralph Rainger, Leo Robin) - 5:00

Personnel 
Walt Dickerson - vibraphone
Austin Crowe – piano
Eustis Guillemet Jr. – bass
Edgar Bateman – drums

References 

Walt Dickerson albums
1961 albums
Albums produced by Esmond Edwards
Albums recorded at Van Gelder Studio
New Jazz Records albums